The Bigelow School is a historic school at 350 West 4th Street in South Boston, Massachusetts.  The three-story Classical Revival brick building was designed by Charles J. Bateman and built in 1901.  Features include corner quoining, cast concrete window lintels and sills.  It was named for John P. Bigelow, mayor of Boston when the first school was built on the site in 1850.  It was closed by 1976.

The building was listed on the National Register of Historic Places in 1985, at which time it was vacant.

See also
National Register of Historic Places listings in southern Boston, Massachusetts

References

School buildings on the National Register of Historic Places in Massachusetts
Schools in Boston
South Boston
National Register of Historic Places in Boston